The X-Seed 4000 was a concept megatall skyscraper.  Its proposed  height,  sea-base, and 800-floor capacity could accommodate 500,000-1,000,000 inhabitants. This structure would be composed of over 3,000,000 tons of steel.

It was designed for Tokyo, Japan by the Taisei Corporation in 1995 as a futuristic environment combining ultra-modern and technological living and interaction with wildlife and nature. Methods of transportation within the X-seed would most likely include Maglev trains.

Georges Binder, managing director of Buildings & Data, a firm which compiles data banks on buildings worldwide, said the X-Seed 4000 "is never meant to be built . . . The purpose of the plan was to earn some recognition for the firm, and it worked."

Unlike conventional skyscrapers, to remain habitable the X-Seed 4000 would be forced to actively protect its occupants from considerable internal air pressure and external air pressure gradations and weather fluctuations that its massive elevation would cause. Its design calls for the use of solar power to maintain internal environmental conditions. As the proposed site for the structure is located in the Pacific Ring of Fire, the most active volcano range in the world, the X-Seed 4000 would be vulnerable to earthquakes and tsunamis.

The Shimizu Mega-City Pyramid (also planned for Tokyo, Japan) faces most of the same problems as the X-Seed.

See also 
 List of visionary tall buildings and structures
 List of tallest buildings and structures in the world
 List of tallest structures in Japan
 List of records of Japan

References

External links 
 Emporis.com Reference

Skyscrapers in Tokyo
Unbuilt buildings and structures in Japan
Megastructures
Unbuilt skyscrapers